The 1957 Florida State Seminoles football team represented Florida State University as an independent during the 1957 NCAA University Division football season. Led by fifth-year head coach Tom Nugent, the Seminoles compiled a record of 4–6.

Burt Reynolds was on this team.

Schedule

Roster
 QB Joe Majors, So.

References

Florida State
Florida State Seminoles football seasons
Florida State Seminoles football